Carnival Games is a video game series for Nintendo's Wii, Nintendo DS, Nintendo 3DS, Nintendo Switch and Microsoft's Kinect for Xbox 360.  It was published by Global Star Software (GSS), which has now been absorbed into Take-Two Interactive (and what is now 2K Play).  The series consists of Carnival Games, Carnival Games Mini-Golf, New Carnival Games, Carnival Games Monkey See, Monkey Do (aka Carnival Games In Action), and Carnival Games Wild West 3D.

Games

References

External links

Party video games
2K Games franchises
Video games developed in the United States
Video game franchises
Take-Two Interactive franchises
Take-Two Interactive games